Majengo is a neighborhood of Mombasa, Kenya, located on Mombasa Island. It had a population of 40,241 in 1999.

It is divided between in the Kisauni and Mvita electoral constituencies.

Populated places in Coast Province
Mombasa